Willie Dunta Robinson (born April 11, 1982) is a former American football cornerback. He played college football at South Carolina and was drafted by the Houston Texans with the 10th overall selection in the 2004 NFL Draft. Robinson also played for the Atlanta Falcons and Kansas City Chiefs.

Early years
Robinson attended Clarke Central High School in Athens, Georgia, and was a three-sport standout in football, basketball, and track.  As a senior for the Gladiators football team, he had four interceptions and eight passes defended. On offense, he rushed for six touchdowns, and ran back a punt and a kickoff for touchdowns. In track, he ran the 100m in 10.93 seconds, and was the state champion in the long jump (7.24m).

College Years
Despite graduating from Clarke Central High School in the literal shadow of the University of Georgia, Robinson committed and signed his national letter of intent to play his college football for legendary coach Lou Holtz at the University of South Carolina on February 7, 2000.

Professional career

2004 NFL Combine

Houston Texans
Robinson was drafted by the Houston Texans 10th overall in the 2004 NFL Draft. He immediately became a starter, starting all 16 games at right cornerback for the Texans in his rookie season, recording 87 tackles and six interceptions. During the 2008 season, Robinson became the all-time Texans' interception leader passing Aaron Glenn with 13 career interceptions.

On February 19, 2009, Robinson became the first Texan in franchise history to be given the franchise tag.  Upset at receiving the tag, Robinson subsequently sat out all of Texans training camp before finally signing a one-year, $9.957 million tender a week before the 2009 NFL season began.  In the Texans' first game against the New York Jets, Robinson's shoes bore the message "Pay Me Rick," directed at Texans' General Manager Rick Smith.  Robinson was fined $25,000 by the NFL for wearing the shoes.

Atlanta Falcons
On March 5, 2010, as an unrestricted free agent, Robinson signed a six-year contract with the Atlanta Falcons worth $54 million with $22.5 million in guaranteed money.

Robinson was fined $50,000 for an illegal hit on a defenseless player when he hit Eagles wide receiver DeSean Jackson on October 17, 2010, in Philadelphia.

On September 18, 2011, Robinson made another illegal helmet-to-helmet hit on Eagles wide receiver Jeremy Maclin.  The NFL fined him $40,000.

On March 1, 2013, in a mildly surprising and abrupt move to clear salary cap space, Robinson was released by the Falcons.  It was also speculated that the Falcons had grown less enamored with Robinson after his repeated personal fouls for illegal hits and a perceived low return on their $54 million investment.  Former All Pro running back Michael Turner and All Pro defensive end John Abraham were also released at the same time by the Falcons as salary cap casualties.

Kansas City Chiefs
Robinson signed with the Kansas City Chiefs on March 8, 2013. On February 7, 2014, Robinson was released by the Chiefs.

NFL statistics

Key
 GP: games played
 TOTAL: total tackles
 SOLO: solo tackles
 AST: assisted tackles
 SACK: sacks
 FF: forced fumbles
 FR: fumble recoveries
 FR YDS: fumble return yards 
 INT: interceptions
 IR YDS: interception return yards
 AVG IR: average interception return
 LNG: longest interception return
 TD: interceptions returned for touchdown
 PD: passes defensed

References

External links
Houston Texans bio
South Carolina Gamecocks bio

1982 births
Living people
Sportspeople from Athens, Georgia
American football cornerbacks
South Carolina Gamecocks football players
Houston Texans players
Atlanta Falcons players
Kansas City Chiefs players